AKA Sir Galahad in Campus, is a 1961 Japanese musical comedy romance film starring Yūzō Kayama and directed by Toshio Sugie. It was the first in a series of films about the "Wakadaishō". Yuzo Kayama plays Yuichi Tanuma, ace of the swimming club of Kyonan university, against the rivalry of the lecherous Shinjiro Ishiyama, played by Kunie Tanaka, nicknamed , the Japanese name of the Japanese rat snake.

Cast
Yūzō Kayama as Yuichi Tanuma, "Wakadaishō"
Ichirō Arishima
Chōko Iida as Grandmother
Machiko Naka
Yuriko Hoshi
Reiko Dan as Kyoko Danno
Akemi Kita
Tatsuyoshi Ehara
Kunie Tanaka as Shinjiro Ishiyama, "Aodaishō"

Release
The film was released on 8 July 1961 in Japan.

References

Bibliography

External links

1961 films
Japanese musical comedy films
Japanese romantic comedy films
1961 musical comedy films
1961 romantic comedy films
Japanese romantic musical films
Films produced by Sanezumi Fujimoto
Toho films
Films directed by Toshio Sugie
1960s romantic musical films
1960s Japanese films